Neolobophorinae is a subfamily of earwigs in the family Forficulidae. There are about 5 genera and 19 described species in Neolobophorinae.

Genera
These five genera belong to the subfamily Neolobophorinae:
 Eudohrnia Burr, 1907
 Metresura Rehn, 1922
 Neolobophora Scudder, 1875
 Setocordax Brindle, 1970
 Tristanella Borelli, 1909

References

Further reading

 
 

Forficulidae